Charles Louis Müller (also known as Müller de Paris) (Paris 22 December 1815 – 10 January 1892  Paris) was a French painter.

Biography
He was the pupil of Léon Cogniet, Baron Gros and others in the École des Beaux-Arts. In 1837 he exhibited his first picture,  Christmas Morning. From 1850 to 1853 he directed the manufactory of Gobelin tapestries. In 1864 he became a member of the Académie des Beaux-Arts of the Institut de France, succeeding Jean-Hippolyte Flandrin.

Works
He was a fecund producer of historic pictures and portraits. Among his works are Heliogabalus (1841), Primavera (1846), Haydée (1848), Lady Macbeth, and his masterpiece, Calling Out the Last Victims of the Reign of Terror at the Prison of Saint-Lazare (Appel des dernières victimes de la Terreur dans la prison de Saint-Lazare), with portraits of the most illustrious victims). Also notable are Vive l'Empereur, based on a poem by Méry about an episode in the battle before Paris, March 30, 1814 (1855), Marie Antoinette (1857), A Mass During the Reign of Terror (1863), Desdemona (1868), Lanjuinais at the Tribune (1869), The Madness of King Lear (1875), Charlotte Corday in Prison (1875), Mater Dolorosa (1877), The Martyrdom of St. Bartholomew and The Massacre of the Innocents.

He executed frescoes for the Salle d'État and the Galerie d'Apollon in the Louvre, and for the ceiling of the Salon Denon.

Gallery (chronological)

References

Sources

External links

 Details regarding Müller's Charlotte Corday in Prison at the Smithsonian Pre-1877 Art Exhibition Catalogue Index.
  Decoration for the ceiling of the Denon room at the Louvre, commissioned in 1862, executed 1863-1866.

1815 births
1892 deaths
19th-century French painters
French male painters
Painters from Paris
Pupils of Antoine-Jean Gros
Burials at Père Lachaise Cemetery
19th-century French male artists